Anoushirvan Sepahbodi ( was an Iranian foreign minister and diplomat.

Career
In 1907 he joined the Foreign Service.
In 1910 he became Vice Consul in Vladikavkaz.
In 1926 he was chief of the protocol.
He was deputy head of the Persian mission next the Sublime Porte in the Ottoman Empire, until he was appointed second deputy chairman of the Consulate General in Tbilisi.
From 1929 to 1931 he was minister in Bern and was Permanent Representative of the Iranian Government to the League of Nations in Geneva.
From July 1933, he served three months as Secretary of State at the Foreign Ministry in Tehran.
From the beginning of 1934 he was ambassador to Rome and was simultaneously accredited to the governments in Vienna, Prague and Budapest.
From December 19, 1933 to January 4, 1935, he negotiated a British-Persian agreement on arms trafficking in Iran and the Persian Gulf. 
From June 1936 to April 1938 he was minister in Moscow.

In July 1938 Anoushirvan Sepahbodi became minister in Paris. In 1939, French satirical magazines like Le Canard enchaîné had presented the qualities of a Persian cat as that of Reza Shah.
Pierre Dac could not hope for more beautiful publicity, even if he never imagined the scandal that an article of  could declencehr.
Because the "French satirical newspapers", especially the weekly he runs, made fun of Reza Shah, diplomatic relations were interrupted. A delegation under the direction of General Maxime Weygand had to apologize to Reza Shah. Anoushirvan Sepahbodi was recalled from Paris and in June 1939 accredited to Francisco Franco in Madrid.

From 1941 to 1945 he was ambassador in Ankara. From October 29, 1945 to early 1946, he served as Foreign Minister in the governments of Ebrahim Hakimi and Mohsen Sadr.
In February 1946, he became Minister of Justice in the Cabinet of Ahmad Qavām.
In September 1946 he was sent to the Paris Peace Conference.
In August 1947 he was appointed Advisor to the Government Cabinet.
From May 1948 he also advised the Cabinet of Ahmad Qavām.
In 1949 he replaced Hakim al-Malik from as royal master of ceremonies, who had been appointed Minister of the Interior.
In 1950, as part of the reforms that led to the introduction of the Senate, Mohammad Reza Pahlavi appointed him to his ministre plénipotentiaire in Tehran, a position he held until October 1953.
From 1954 to 1959 he was ambassador to Cairo.
From 1962 to 1966 he was ambassador to the Holy See.
In 1966 he was retired after 60 years of service.

References 

Ministers of Justice of Iran
Ambassadors of Iran to Switzerland
Ambassadors of Iran to Italy
Ambassadors of Iran to Russia
Ambassadors of Iran to France
Ambassadors of Iran to Spain
Ambassadors of Iran to Turkey
Ambassadors of Iran to Egypt
Ambassadors of Iran to the Holy See
Foreign ministers of Iran
1888 births
1982 deaths